is a Japanese voice actor. His major roles include: Koutaro Taiga in The King of Braves GaoGaiGar, Giovanni Bertuccio in Gankutsuou: The Count of Monte Cristo, Shigematsu in Toriko, and Prime Minister Honest in Akame ga Kill!. In video games, he is the voice of Ryuji Yamazaki and Sokaku Mochizuki in the Fatal Fury series. He also voices Kaji Hyogo in Lime-iro Senkitan, Barlowe in Castlevania: Order of Ecclesia, Ikutidaal in Harukanaru Toki no Naka de, and Matsunaga Hisahide in Samurai Warriors Chronicles 3 and Samurai Warriors 4.

Filmography

Anime

Tokusatsu

Film

Video games

Drama CDs

Overseas dubbing

References

External links
 Official agency profile  

 Kōji Ishii at GamePlaza-Haruka- Voice Acting DataBase 
 Kōji Ishii at Hitoshi Doi's Seiyuu Database
 

1960 births
Living people
People from Wakayama (city)
Male voice actors from Wakayama Prefecture
Japanese male video game actors
Japanese male voice actors
20th-century Japanese male actors
21st-century Japanese male actors
Wakayama University alumni